Dr Abdul Habib Sahu Khan served two terms as an Indian nominated member of the Legislative Council of Fiji from 1957 to 1963. His brother Abdul Rahman was also an MLC during the 1940s.

He is credited with proposing the idea of the South Pacific Games during the 1959 South Pacific Conference in Rabaul, Papua New Guinea which led to the first games in Fiji in 1963.

Sahu Khan, who died on 29 August 2007, had lived for much of the latter part of his life in Sydney, Australia.

References

Indian members of the Legislative Council of Fiji
Year of birth missing
2007 deaths
Fijian emigrants to Australia